Rockingham Community College is a public community college in Wentworth, North Carolina, in Rockingham County. It is part of the North Carolina Community College System.

External links 
 Official website

Two-year colleges in the United States
North Carolina Community College System colleges
Education in Rockingham County, North Carolina
Universities and colleges accredited by the Southern Association of Colleges and Schools
Schools in Rockingham County, North Carolina
NJCAA athletics
Educational institutions established in 1966
1966 establishments in North Carolina